Canworthy Water is a settlement in northeast Cornwall, England, United Kingdom. It is situated beside the River Ottery at  approximately seven miles (11 km) northeast of Camelford.

Canworthy Water is mainly in the civil parish of Warbstow (Detached), with parts north of the River Ottery in Jacobstow civil parish.

The original village of Canworthy is north of the river Ottery and the more modern, and subsequently larger village, Canworthy Water is located on the river.

References

Villages in Cornwall